Bolgatanga Girls Senior High School is an all female second cycle institution in Bolgatanga in the Upper East Region of Ghana, established in 1956 as a girls' middle boarding school and converted to a women's teaching college in 1965 and to a girls' senior high school in 1973.

References

Girls' schools in Ghana
Schools in Ghana
Upper East Region
Educational institutions established in 1956
1956 establishments in Gold Coast (British colony)